Showbusiness! is a 1994 live album by anarchist punk band Chumbawamba. It was recorded on the 18 and 19 August 1994 at the Duchess of York in Leeds.

In response to threats from fascists who rang the venue to say they'd turn up mob-handed and trash it "if Chumbawamba play", Leeds Anti-Fascist Action organised security. Fittingly, all the money from both concerts (around £1500) was given to AFA.

The album was issued in the United States as the For A Free Humanity: For Anarchy double CD, coupling Showbusiness! with Noam Chomsky's Capital Rules.

Track listing
All songs written and arranged by Chumbawamba.

Mobile studio and recording/engineering: Neil Ferguson

Personnel

 Harry Hamer - Drums
 Danbert Nobacon - Vocals
 Dunstan Bruce - Percussion
 Lou Watts - Vocals, Keyboards
 Alice Nutter - Vocals
 Mavis Dillon - Trumpet, Vocals
 Paul Greco - Bass
 Boff Whalley - Guitar, Vocals

Chumbawamba albums
1994 live albums
One Little Independent Records live albums